The Armed Forces of China may refer to:

 People's Liberation Army, the armed forces of the Chinese Communist Party and of the People's Republic of China
 Republic of China Armed Forces, the armed forces of the Republic of China (Taiwan)
 National Revolutionary Army of Kuomintang

See also
 Armed Forces of the People's Republic of China (disambiguation)